Shenzhou is a county-level city under the administration of the prefecture-level city of Hengshui, Hebei province, China.

Administrative divisions

Towns:
Tangfeng, Shenzhou Town, Chenshi, Yuke, Weiqiao, Dadi, Qianmotou, Wangjiajing, Hujiachi

Townships:
Bingcao Township, Mucun Township, Dong'anzhuang Township, Beixicun Township, Dafengying Township, Qiaotun Township, Taiguzhuang Township, Datun Township

Climate

References

External links

County-level cities in Hebei
Hengshui